Media-Providence Friends School is a Quaker school founded as Media Friends School in Media, Pennsylvania in 1876.

History and facilities

In 1867 the members of Chester Monthly Meeting in Media, which was later renamed Media Monthly Meeting, started the school over a small stable on Baltimore Pike. Students included non-Friends, as well as members of the orthodox Chester Monthly Meeting and the Hicksite Providence Friends Meeting in Media. At the beginning of the century the Quaker religious meeting moved to 125 West 3rd Street and expanded. The small brick school building was built in 1896 with additions added in 1908 and 1918.

Later the school moved into the building on 3rd Street. The west end of the main building was changed in 1935 when space was needed to create three more classrooms. In 1957, the Social Room, and the meeting room were remodeled to create classrooms above it. A school office and lounge were added in 1965; in 1973 more changes were made when the school expanded to eighth grade. In 1991 a major addition of a gymnasium and four more classrooms were completed. These classrooms included a science classroom and a foreign language classroom. It is referred to as the Middle School Building because middle school students have home room there in addition to humanities and mathematics classes.

Most recently, in 2006, a new classroom building was completed that currently houses the first and second grade classes. During this period of renovation the small brick 1886 building was renovated. There is now a brick central courtyard that connects the new building to the main building with a covered walkway.

INTRODUCTION 
The history of Media Friends School for the past 100 years has been and continues to be written in the lives and achievements of its students and teachers primarily, and in those members of the various school committees and Meetings which have nurtured it through 10 decades. 

What is offered in this modest volume is a digest of minutes, reports and recollections of the events which took place in the school since Anna Yarnall first faced 12 students in a room over a livery stable m 1876. 

The basic research and copy for the material in the first six chapters was prepared in the summer of 1975 by Vincent Pinto, who taught at the school for the 1974–75 term. 
This past Spring the Joint Centennial Committee asked the undersigned to complete and prepare the material for publication. The task was accepted with the assurance that many Friends were anxious anJ willing to assist where needed. This assistance has been abundant. 

Special appreciation goes to the members of the Centennial Committee: Mark Wayne Bailey, David C.(and Marian D.) Elkinton, Virginia W. Heck, Dorothy Biddle James, L. Eldon Lindley, Jr., and H. Mather Lippincott, Jr.

Others who shared either reminiscences, photographs or advice were: Murry Engle, Louise Lindley Wells, Ruth Harvey Mavronikolas, Cyril Harvey, J. Robert James, Walter Kahoe, Lucie Logan Stephens, Margaret Palmer Read, Charles E. Pusey, Sr., Mary James Hetzel, the Rev. Mr. and Mrs. Maxwell Adams, Joan Adams Mondale, Bettie Smedley, Thelr:na McKnight, Veronica Barbato, and Esther Darlington Rosenberg. Dr. Theodore B. Hetzel, F. W. (Rick) Echelmeyer, Jr., and David Camp provided special photo• graphic assistance. 
Finally, I wish to express my appreciation for the editorial assistance of Sarah Cope Swan, who brought her love for Media Friends and her skills to the task of getting this volume ready for publication. 

Jane James was invaluable, always available when facts or contacts had to be obtained, and Janet Baker took time from a demanding business commitment to read proof. 
Readers should know that the use of maiden and married names, carried to a point not usual in published material, was done to simplify identification. 
Quotations from Faith and Practice were taken from the book adopted in 1955 and revised in 1961 by the Philadelphia Yearly Meeting of the Religious Society of Friends. Frederick W. Echelmeyer August 18, 1976 

Read about the first one hundred years A Century of Love and Learning.

See also
List of Friends schools

External links

Media Friends School records at Haverford College Quaker & Special Collections

References

Quaker schools in Pennsylvania
Educational institutions established in 1876
Private elementary schools in Pennsylvania
Private middle schools in Pennsylvania
1876 establishments in Pennsylvania